Yannick Driesen (born November 2, 1988) is a Belgian basketball player. Driesen usually plays as center. Driesen played with the Belgium national basketball team at EuroBasket 2013.

References

External links
Profile at ACB.com

1988 births
Belgian men's basketball players
Belgian expatriate basketball people in Spain
Antwerp Giants players
CB Estudiantes players
Centers (basketball)
Living people
Sportspeople from Antwerp
UB La Palma players